Flávio Pagano "Nonô" Figueiredo (born May 13, 1971, in São Paulo) is a Brazilian auto racing driver. He is better known as "Nonô"" Figueiredo and drives in the Brazilian V8 Stock Car Series. He started racing in Karting in 1984, winning several championship titles. In 1989 and 1990 he raced in some North American Formula Ford races. In 1993 he drove in the Italian formula 3 Championship, followed by Formula Fiat drives back in Brazil in 1995 and 1996, with six race wins in two years.

He raced in Great Britain in 1997, driving for TJ Motorsport in the Vauxhall Vectra Challenge with four race wins. In 1998 he achieved more success, with another four wins that year. This earned him a drive for two races in the British Touring Car Championship for the works Vauxhall team, replacing the injured John Cleland for the rounds at Thruxton. Since 2000 he has raced back in Brazil, in the V8 Stock cars (until 2014) and Brasileiro de Marcas (2015).

Racing record

Complete British Touring Car Championship results
(key) (Races in bold indicate pole position - 1 point awarded all races) (Races in italics indicate fastest lap) (* signifies that driver lead feature race for at least one lap - 1 point awarded)

Partial Stock Car Brasil results
(key) (Races in bold indicate pole position) (Races in italics indicate fastest lap)

Complete Porsche Supercup results
(key) (Races in bold indicate pole position) (Races in italics indicate fastest lap)

 Season still in progress.

External links
  - 
 
 Profile  - from Stock Car Brasil official website. 

1971 births
Living people
Racing drivers from São Paulo
Brazilian racing drivers
Stock Car Brasil drivers
British Touring Car Championship drivers
TC 2000 Championship drivers
Italian Formula Three Championship drivers
European Le Mans Series drivers
24 Hours of Daytona drivers
Rolex Sports Car Series drivers
Porsche Supercup drivers
International GT Open drivers
24H Series drivers